Fifth Ward is an unincorporated community and census-designated place in Avoyelles Parish, Louisiana, United States. As of the 2010 census, it had a population of 800.

Demographics

References

Census-designated places in Louisiana
Census-designated places in Avoyelles Parish, Louisiana